Ronald "Ron" F. Maxwell (born January 5, 1949) is an American film director and screenwriter from Clifton, New Jersey. He is most famous for writing and directing the American Civil War historical fiction films Gettysburg (1993), Gods and Generals (2003), and Copperhead (2013).

Biography
A native of New Jersey, Maxwell attended Clifton High School. He graduated from New York University (NYU) Institute of Film 1970. Maxwell is a member of the Writers Guild of America, Directors Guild of America and the Academy of Motion Picture Arts and Sciences.

In 2007, Maxwell optioned the film rights to novelist Speer Morgan's 1979 book Belle Starr about the legendary female outlaw of the Old West.

In May 2011, Warner Bros. released director's cuts of Gods and Generals and Gettysburg.

In 2012, Maxwell produced and directed his third Civil War feature, Copperhead, with a screenplay by Bill Kauffman. Filming was completed in New Brunswick, Canada in June, 2012.

Filmography
 Sea Marks (1976) (TV)
 Verna: USO Girl (1978) (TV)
 Little Darlings (1980)
 The Night the Lights Went Out in Georgia (1981)
 Kidco (1984)
 The Parent Trap II (1986) (TV)
 In the Land of the Poets (1987)
 Gettysburg (1993)
 Gods and Generals (2003)
 Copperhead (2013)

References

External links

Living people
Tisch School of the Arts alumni
Clifton High School (New Jersey) alumni
People from Clifton, New Jersey
Film directors from New Jersey
1949 births